Joanna Roos (born Dorothy Roos, January 11, 1901 – May 13, 1989) was an American Broadway, radio, and television actress and a playwright. She was born in Brooklyn in 1901 and attended Syracuse University as well as Yvette Guilbert's School in New York and Paris.

Early years
Roos was the daughter of Mr. and Mrs. John A. Roos of Upper Montclair, New Jersey. She was born in Brooklyn, and her family moved to Syracuse when she was 10 years old. She completed high school in Syracuse and earned a bachelor of arts degree from Syracuse University. She earned money for her college expenses by working as a stenographer at The Post-Standard, a Syracuse newspaper and by giving readings with touring Lyceum companies.

After Roos graduated from college, she studied at Yvette Guilbert's School of the Theatre.

Career
Roos's professional theatrical debut occurred in May 1921 in a performance of The Harlequinade at the Neighborhood Playhouse in New York City.

In 1930, Roos performed the role of Sofya Alexandrovna in a classic performance of the Anton Chekhov play Uncle Vanya at the Cort Theatre in New York City, a production that one critic called "unforgettable".  The show ran for 71 performances. Her other Broadway credits included Peer Gynt (1960), Orpheus Descending (1957), Joan of Lorraine (1946), War President (1944), The Trojan Women (1941), Abe Lincoln in Illinois (1938), Daughters of Atreus (1936), Black Widow (1936), Panic (1935), Tight Britches (1934), Life Begins (1932), Little Women (1931), Schoolgirl (1930), Veneer (1929), Grand Street Follies [1928], Lovers and Enemies (1927), Makropoulos Secret (1926), Loggerheads (1925),Grand Street Follies [1924], This Fine-Pretty World (1923), The Player Queen (1923), The Green Ring (1922), and The Idle Inn (1921).

She starred as Elizabeth Stallworth in "The House," written by Art Wallace, a 30-minute episode of the mystery anthology series The Web, broadcast on live television airing on August 29, 1954. In 1958, Roos was a member of the cast of Today Is Ours, a drama on NBC Television. 

On radio, Roos was heard on Joyce Jordan, M.D. and other soap operas. 

She retired in 1978 from her role as Sarah Dale Caldwell McCauley on the soap opera Love of Life. She had played the role from 1968 to 1978, which marked her second role on the series, which became her best known role. In 1955–1957, she had originally played the role of compassionate Althea Raven, the first mother in-law of heroine Vanessa Dale.

She was a founding member of the New Dramatists Committee. Several of the plays she wrote for the group won awards.

Personal life
Roos was married to musician Edmund Rickett.

Filmography

Gallery

References

External links 
 
 
 
 Joanna Roos at tv.yahoo.com 

1901 births
1989 deaths
American stage actresses
Syracuse University alumni
20th-century American actresses
Writers from Brooklyn
American soap opera actresses
American radio actresses
Actresses from New York City
American women dramatists and playwrights
20th-century American dramatists and playwrights
20th-century American women writers